Repo Tercious Malepe (born 18 February 1997) is a South African footballer who plays as a defender for AmaZulu and the South African national team. He represented the South Africa under-23 team at the 2020 Summer Olympics. He also represented South Africa in the football competition at the 2016 Summer Olympics, he holds the record of being the first ever male South African footballer to participate in two consecutive Olympic Games.

International career

International goals
Scores and results list South Africa's goal tally first.

References

External links
 

South African soccer players
South African expatriate soccer players
1997 births
Living people
Footballers at the 2016 Summer Olympics
Olympic soccer players of South Africa
Association football defenders
Orlando Pirates F.C. players
Moroka Swallows F.C. players
Cape Town Spurs F.C. players
Chippa United F.C. players
FC Mynai players
AmaZulu F.C. players
National First Division players
South African Premier Division players
South Africa international soccer players
Ukrainian Premier League players
Expatriate footballers in Ukraine
Footballers at the 2020 Summer Olympics
People from Middelburg, Mpumalanga